Randy Gardner (born ) is an American man from San Diego, California, who set the record for the longest amount of time a human has gone without sleep. In December 1963/January 1964, 17-year-old Gardner stayed awake for 11 days and 24 minutes (264.4 hours), breaking the previous record of 260 hours held by Tom Rounds.

Gardner's record attempt was attended by Stanford sleep researcher Dr. William C. Dement, while his health was monitored by Lt. Cmdr. John J. Ross.  A log was kept by two of Gardner's classmates from Point Loma High School, Bruce McAllister and Joe Marciano Jr. Accounts of Gardner's sleep-deprivation experience and medical response became widely known among the sleep research community.

Health effects
It has been claimed that Gardner's experiment demonstrated that extreme sleep deprivation has little effect, other than the mood changes associated with tiredness, primarily due to a report by researcher William Dement, who stated that on the tenth day of the experiment, Gardner had been, among other things, able to beat Dement at pinball. However, Lt. Cmdr. John J. Ross, who monitored his health, reported serious cognitive and behavioral changes. These included moodiness, problems with concentration and short term memory, paranoia, and hallucinations. On the eleventh day, when he was asked to subtract seven repeatedly, starting with 100, he stopped at 65. When asked why he had stopped, he replied that he had forgotten what he was doing.

On his final day, Gardner presided over a press conference where he appeared to be in excellent health. "I wanted to prove that bad things didn't happen if you went without sleep," said Gardner. "I thought, 'I can break that record and I don't think it would be a negative experience.'"

Recovery
Gardner's sleep recovery was observed by sleep researchers who noted changes in sleep structure during post-deprivation recovery. After completing his record, Gardner slept for 14 hours and 46 minutes, awoke naturally around 8:40 p.m., and stayed awake until about 7:30 p.m. the next day, when he slept an additional ten and a half hours. Gardner appeared to have fully recovered from his loss of sleep, with follow up sleep recordings taken one, six, and ten weeks after the fact showing no significant differences.  However, Gardner later reported experiencing serious insomnia decades after his sleep experiment.

Subsequent record information
According to news reports, Gardner's record has been broken a number of times. Some of these cases are described below for comparison. Gardner's case still stands out, however, because it has been so extensively documented. It is difficult to determine the accuracy of a sleep deprivation period unless the participant is carefully observed to detect short microsleeps, which the participant might not even notice. Also, records for voluntary sleep deprivation are no longer kept by Guinness World Records for fear that participants will suffer ill effects.

Some sources report that Gardner's record was broken a month later by Toimi Soini, in Hamina, Finland, who stayed awake for  days, or 276 hours from February 5–15, 1964. The Guinness World Records record was set by Maureen Weston, of Peterborough, Cambridgeshire, UK, on May 2, 1977, after presumably staying awake for 449 hours during a rocking-chair marathon.  Because of the policy against maintaining this record, recent editions of Guinness do not provide any information about sleep deprivation.

More recently, Tony Wright on May 25, 2007, was reported to have exceeded Randy Gardner's feat in the apparent belief that Gardner's record had not been beaten. He used 24-hour video for documentation.

The Australian National Sleep Research Project states the record for sleep deprivation is 18 days, 21 hours, and 40 minutes.

See also
 Sleep deprivation

References

Further reading
 
 
 The Sleepwatchers, William C. Dement, Nychthemeron Press, 1996,

External links
 Sleep Deprivation, Psychosis and Mental Efficiency - article from Psychiatric Times noting Gardner and Tripp cases
 Is Sleep Essential?, An examination of available evidence of whether sleep is a biological necessity.
 ->PBS website ->Apple podcast ->transcript of PBS Hidden Brain Podcast with Randy Gardner (54 minutes)

1946 births
Living people
People from San Diego
Sleeplessness and sleep deprivation
Experiments
World record holders